Gilson Jesus da Silva, known as Gilson (Macedonian: Жилсон, Žilson; born 12 June 1973, in Brazil) is a naturalised Macedonian retired football player.

Club career
He played for many seasons with FK Pobeda in the Macedonian First League. He also had spells with Kastoria F.C. in Greek Beta Ethniki and KS Besëlidhja Lezhë in Albanian Superliga.

International career
He played one match for the Macedonian national team, coming on as a second-half substitute for Vulnet Emini in a 1–0 victory over Turkey in a friendly match played on 4 June 2006.

Honours
Pobeda Prilep
Macedonian First League: 2003–04
Macedonian Cup: 2001-02

Individual:
Macedonian First League best foreign player: 2004

References

External sources
 

1973 births
Living people
Footballers from São Paulo
Macedonian footballers
North Macedonia international footballers
Brazilian footballers
Brazilian emigrants to North Macedonia
Macedonian people of Brazilian descent
Association football midfielders
FK Pobeda players
Kastoria F.C. players
Besëlidhja Lezhë players
Macedonian First Football League players
Football League (Greece) players
Kategoria Superiore players
Brazilian expatriate footballers
Macedonian expatriate footballers
Expatriate footballers in Greece
Brazilian expatriate sportspeople in Greece
Macedonian expatriate sportspeople in Greece
Expatriate footballers in Albania
Brazilian expatriate sportspeople in Albania
Macedonian expatriate sportspeople in Albania